The Portuguese Albums Chart ranks the best-performing albums in Portugal, as compiled by the Associação Fonográfica Portuguesa.

See also
 List of number-one singles of 2016 (Portugal)

References

Number one albums
Portugal
Albums 2016